The Climate Corporation is a digital agriculture company that examines weather, soil and field data to help farmers determine potential yield-limiting factors in their fields.

History
The company was founded as WeatherBill in 2006 by two former Google employees, David Friedberg and Siraj Khaliq.

The company began as a startup focused on helping people and businesses manage and adapt to climate change, by providing weather insurance to ski resorts, large event venues, and farmers. In 2010, it decided to focus exclusively on agriculture, and launched the Total Weather Insurance Product in fall 2010 for corn and soybeans.

In late 2010 and early 2011, SV Angel invested in WeatherBill's Series B.

On October 11, 2011, WeatherBill changed its name to The Climate Corporation.

In June 2013, the U.S. Department of Agriculture's Risk Management Agency authorized the Climate Corporation to administer federal crop insurance policies for the 2014 crop year.

In October 2013, Monsanto announced that it was acquiring the company for approximately $1.1 billion.

In November 2013, the company launched Climate Basic and Climate Pro, a set of advisory tools for farmers utilizing data science to help farmers make optimal decisions.

In February 2014, the company announced it merged with Monsanto’s Integrated Farming System and Precision Planting divisions. In February 2014, the company also acquired Solum, a soil testing company based in Ames, Iowa.

In December 2014, the company acquired 640 Labs, an agricultural technology startup based in Chicago. 640 Labs created the Drive device (later renamed the Fieldview Drive) that reads data from the CANBUS of tractors and connects to an iPad or iPhone.  

In July 2015, the company sold its crop insurance business to AmTrust Financial Services, enabling The Climate Corporation to focus exclusively on its digital agriculture platform. Details of the agreement were not disclosed.

In September 2015, the company re-branded its Climate Basic and Climate Pro products as Climate FieldView.

In November 2015, the company signed a definitive agreement with John Deere to sell Precision Planting LLC.

In March 2016, the company announced data connectivity agreements with several agronomic retailers and retailer software systems through the use of APIs.

In May 2017, the agreement to sell Precision Planting LLC to John Deere was terminated. In August 2016, the U.S. Department of Justice had filed a lawsuit to block the sale, arguing the deal could make it more expensive for farmers to use fast, precise planting technology. Precision Planting CEO Michael Stern stated: "We just didn't see that there was a clear path going forward, that the DOJ was going to approve the transaction. We have a valuable business and people in limbo and it was just time to move on."

Products
Formerly Climate Basic and Climate Pro, the Climate Corporation re-branded its product to Climate FieldView, making the announcement at the 2015 Farm Progress Show. The Climate FieldView Platform uses data science to provide farmers insights and data of their fields based on historical crop, field, and weather data.

Field Health Advisor provides farmers satellite images of their fields depicting crop health and vegetation maps. 
Script Creator allows farmers to create variable-rate prescriptions before planting.

Climate FieldView Drive is a Bluetooth enabled device that plugs into a tractor or combine and reads machine data during planting and harvest. The data is displayed in real-time to the Climate FieldView Cab app.

Climate FieldView Prime includes weather and scouting. It allows farmers to see a weather forecast up to three hours in advance, and provides the ability to scout potential issues in the field. Farmers can drop a pin on that location on the map to scout the precise location throughout the season.

Further reading
“WeatherBill morphs brand to focus on climate”, “Gigaom.com”, October 10, 2011
 “Insuring against extreme weather”, msnbc.msn.com, October 10, 2011
“Fill the Gap”, “AgWeb.com”, November 16, 2011
“Climate Corporation offers precise weather insurance coverage”, “FarmIndustryNews.com”, November 3, 2011

“Weather Insurance Reinvented: Coverage Fills Cracks in Crop Insurance”, “DTNProgressiveFarmer.com”, November 2, 2011
“Data Powers New Insurance Product”, “FarmFutures.com”, November 1, 2011
 Specter, Michael. "Why the Climate Corporation Sold Itself to Monsanto", "The New Yorker", November 3, 2013
 Specter, Michael. “Climate by Numbers: Can a tech firm help farmers survive global warming?”, “The New Yorker”, November 11, 2013, pp. 38–43

References

External links
Official website

Agricultural organizations based in the United States
Companies based in San Francisco
Technology companies established in 2006
American companies established in 2006